The Roman Catholic Diocese of San Martín  is located in the city of San Martín, Buenos Aires, Argentina.  It was established by Saint John XXIII on 10 April 1961.

Bishops

Ordinaries
Manuel Menéndez (bishop) (1961–1991) 
Luis Héctor Villalba (1991–1999), appointed Archbishop of Tucumán; future Cardinal
Raúl Omar Rossi (2000–2003) 
Guillermo Rodríguez Melgarejo (2003–2018)
Miguel Ángel D’Annibale (2018-2020)
Martín Fassi (2020-

Auxiliary bishops
Horacio Alberto Bózzoli (1973-1975), appointed Auxiliary Bishop of Buenos Aires
Han Lim Moon (2014-

References

External links
 

San Martin
San Martin
San Martin
San Martin
1961 establishments in Argentina